The seashore earwig (Anisolabis littorea) is a species of earwig in the family Anisolabididae. The species was first described in 1846 by Adam White. This species has a blackish-brown body with brown-yellow legs. It has two light brown spots on its head, close to the inside of each eye. Its abdomen is widest at the seventh segment. It is flightless.
It is native to eastern Australia and New Zealand. Similar both ecologically and taxonomically to the maritime earwig, this species is commonly found on beaches under stones and debris. It is a carnivore, feeding on millipedes, flies, and isopods such as woodlice. Like most other earwigs, the females care for their young during development, and the larva go through five instars before becoming adults. The species also has a negative phototaxis, meaning that it tends to move away from a light source.

See also
 List of Dermapterans of Australia

References

Anisolabididae
Insects of New Zealand
Insects of the Philippines
Insects described in 1846